A. flavescens may refer to:

 Acacia flavescens, a tree native to eastern Australia
 Acanthoscelides flavescens, a bean weevil
 Acromyrmex flavescens, a leaf-cutter ant
 Adelotopus flavescens, a ground beetle
 Adelpherupa flavescens, a grass moth
 Aedes flavescens, a mosquito that carries heartworm
 Agathis flavescens, a conifer endemic to Peninsular Malaysia
 Agave flavescens, a Mexican plant
 Aglaia flavescens, an Oceanian plant
 Alternanthera flavescens, a flowering plant
 Alyxia flavescens, an Australasian dogbane
 Amaranthus flavescens, an annual plant
 Anoectochilus flavescens, a jewel orchid
 Anoteropsis flavescens, a wolf spider
 Antennaria flavescens, a daisy native to western North America
 Anthenea flavescens, a sea star
 Anthericum flavescens, a flowering plant
 Anthurium flavescens, a flamingo flower
 Antigonon flavescens, an American buckwheat
 Aphnaeus flavescens, an African butterfly
 Apoctena flavescens, a tortrix moth
 Apotomus flavescens, a ground beetle
 Apriona flavescens, a longhorn beetle
 Aquilegia flavescens, a North American wildflower
 Arcyria flavescens, an amoeboid protozoan
 Argostemma flavescens, a flowering plant
 Argulus flavescens, a carp louse
 Argyrodes flavescens, an Asian spider
 Ariteus flavescens, a bat endemic to Jamaica
 Aspergillus flavescens, a saprotrophic mold
 Astragalus flavescens, a plant native to the Northern Hemisphere
 Asura flavescens, an Asian moth
 Atelopus flavescens, a toad endemic to French Guiana
 Austrostipa flavescens, a true grass